The world record in the half marathon has been officially recognised since 1 January 2004 by the International Association of Athletics Federations (IAAF), the international governing body for the sport of athletics. A total of five men's world records and six women's world records have been officially ratified since that date. The IAAF officially recognised the fastest times prior to that date as a "world best" from 1 January 2003 onwards. Before that date, the IAAF did not recognise any road running world records, though the concept of a world record was recognised by other organisations, such as the Association of Road Racing Statisticians (ARRS).

The men's half-marathon world record is 57:31, set by Ugandan Jacob Kiplimo on  during the Lisbon Half Marathon.

The women's record is 1:02:52, set by Letesenbet Gidey on 24 October 2021, at the Valencia Half Marathon. The previous record of 1:04:02 was set by Ruth Chepngetich of Kenya on 4 April 2021, in Istanbul, Turkey. On 8 September 2019, Brigid Kosgei ran a time of 64:28 minutes at the 2019 Great North Run in Newcastle, England, 23 seconds faster than previous best, however the Great North Run is not eligible for record purposes. The IAAF has since 2011 also kept records for the fastest time run by women in women-only races (i.e. without male pacemakers). The best time for that category is held by Peres Jepchirchir, who ran 1:05:16 in Gdynia on 17 October 2020.  There was some criticism of this change, as the IAAF originally intended to downgrade world records set in mixed gender races to "world best" status, but in response the organisation agreed to maintain historic marks as official.

Races close to the official half marathon distance of 21.0975 kilometres (13.1094 mi) had taken place throughout the early 20th century, and athletes had also been timed at the midpoint of full marathons, but the first half marathon races proper emerged in the 1960s. Some of that era, such as the Route du Vin Half Marathon and San Blas Half Marathon (which both took the official distance in 1966) are extant today. The earliest half marathon world record accepted by the Association of Track and Field Statisticians is that of 67:01 minutes ran by Englishman Brian Hill-Cottingham in Romford in 1960. For women, the earliest ARRS-recognised time is that of American Kathy Gibbons, who finished the distance in 83:56 on 7 March 1971 in Phoenix, Arizona. The earliest men's and women's marks recognised as world records by the IAAF are 65:44 set by Ron Hill in 1965 and 75:04 set by Marty Cooksey in 1978.

On 30 March 1991, Arturo Barrios ran a world record distance of 21.101 km in one hour, becoming the first man to run the half marathon distance in under one hour. On 3 April 1993, Moses Tanui became the first man to run a half marathon race in under one hour, with a time of 59:47.

World record progression
Key:

Men

Women

Notes

References

External links

Association of Track and Field Statisticians website

World record
World athletics record progressions